Bränna is a village situated in Mellerud Municipality, Västra Götaland County, Sweden. It had 228 inhabitants in 2005.

References 

Populated places in Västra Götaland County
Populated places in Mellerud Municipality
Dalsland